Black Eagle is a 1988 American action film directed by Eric Karson and starring Shō Kosugi, Jean-Claude van Damme, and Kane Kosugi. It was shot on the Mediterranean island of Malta. The film was released in the United States on May 19, 1988.

Plot
Ken Tani (Shō Kosugi), a martial artist and special operative for the American government codenamed "Black Eagle", is summoned by his superiors after an F-111 carrying an experimental black ops laser tracking device was shot down over Malta by Russian forces. A group of elite KGB agents led by Colonel Vladimir Klimenko and his brutal and enigmatic right-hand man Andrei (Jean-Claude van Damme) have been dispatched to Malta to retrieve the device for their own ends. Tani, alongside CIA agent Patricia Parker (Doran Clark) and his sons Brian (Kane Kosugi) and Denny (Shane Kosugi) travel to Malta to find the device before Andrei does, leading to an eventual face-to-face encounter.

Cast
 Shō Kosugi as Ken Tani
 Jean-Claude Van Damme as Andrei
 Doran Clark as Patricia Parker
 Bruce French as Father Joseph Bedelia
 Vladimir Skomarovsky as Colonel Vladimir Klimenko
 William Bassett as Dean Rickert
 Kane Kosugi as Brian Tani
 Shane Kosugi as Denny Tani
 Alfred Mallia as Peter

Reception

Critical response
Critics gave the film a mixed reception overall.

References

External links
 
 

1988 films
1988 martial arts films
1980s spy action films
American spy action films
American martial arts films
Cold War spy films
Films about the Central Intelligence Agency
Films set in Malta
Films shot in Rome
Films shot in Malta
Films directed by Eric Karson
Films scored by Terry Plumeri
1980s English-language films
1980s American films